16th meridian may refer to:

16th meridian east, a line of longitude east of the Greenwich Meridian
16th meridian west, a line of longitude west of the Greenwich Meridian